Hi, Good Lookin'! is a 1944 American comedy film directed by Edward C. Lilley and written by Paul Gerard Smith, Bradford Ropes and Eugene Conrad. The film stars Harriet Nelson, Eddie Quillan, Kirby Grant, Betty Kean, Roscoe Karns, Vivian Austin, Marjorie Gateson and Fuzzy Knight. The film was released on March 22, 1944, by Universal Pictures.

Plot

In an effort to help a pretty girl to realize her dreams as a singer, a radio station usher impersonates a station executive.

Cast        
Harriet Nelson as Kelly Clark
Eddie Quillan as Dynamo Carson
Kirby Grant as King Castle
Betty Kean as Peggy
Roscoe Karns as Archie
Vivian Austin as Phyllis
Marjorie Gateson as Mrs. Clara Hardacre
Fuzzy Knight as Joe Smedley
Milburn Stone as Bill Eaton
Frank Fenton as Gib Dickson
Robert Emmett Keane as Homer Hardacre
Ozzie Nelson as himself
Jack Teagarden as himself
The Delta Rhythm Boys as Themselves
Tip, Tap and Toe

References

External links
 

1944 films
American comedy films
1944 comedy films
Universal Pictures films
American black-and-white films
1940s English-language films
Films directed by Edward C. Lilley
1940s American films